Harz is a district in Saxony-Anhalt, Germany.

History 

The district was established by merging the former districts of Halberstadt, Wernigerode and Quedlinburg as well as the city of Falkenstein (from the district of Aschersleben-Staßfurt) as part of the reform of 2007.

Towns and municipalities

The district Harz consists of the following subdivisions:

See also
Ilsenburg (Verwaltungsgemeinschaft)

References

 
Districts of Saxony-Anhalt
Harz